Cyclonic rotation, or cyclonic circulation, is atmospheric motion in the same direction as a planet's rotation, as opposed to anticyclonic rotation. For Earth, the Coriolis effect causes cyclonic rotation to be in a counterclockwise direction in the Northern Hemisphere and clockwise in the Southern Hemisphere. A closed area of winds rotating cyclonically is known as a cyclone.

References

External links
Cyclonic Rotation - AMS Glossary of Meteorology

Climate patterns